The Rivière Lafleur, sometimes called Rivière à la Fleur, is a watercourse of the Île d'Orléans located between the Maheu River and the village of Saint-Jean-de-l'Île-d'Orléans. Its course is exclusively in the municipality of Saint-Jean-de-l'Île-d'Orléans, in the L'Île-d'Orléans Regional County Municipality, in the administrative region of Capitale-Nationale, in the province of Quebec, in Canada.

It flows into a small harbor in the St. Lawrence River. It has long offered in its mouth] a shelter for fishing boats stranded at low tide.

The lower part of this small valley is served by Chemin Royale (route 368) which runs along the southeast shore of Île d'Orléans. Agriculture is the main economic activity in the upper part of this valley. 

The surface of the Lafleur River is generally frozen from the beginning of December until the end of March; however, safe circulation on the ice is generally done from mid-December to mid-March. The water level of the river varies with the seasons and the precipitation; the spring flood occurs in March or April.

Geography 
The Lafleur river originates in the "Les Savanes" marshes, at the limit of the forest and agricultural zones, in Saint-Jean-de-l'Île-d'Orléans.

  towards the southwest by following more or less the limit of the forest zone in Saint-Jean-de-l'Île-d'Orléans, then generally in agricultural zone at the end of the segment, up to a bend in the river;
  southward generally in agricultural area, to its mouth.

The Lafleur river flows at the bottom of a small harbor (length:  at low tide), in the hamlet "Rivière Lafleur" in Saint-Jean-de-l'Île-d'Orléans. The bridge at route 368 spans the Lafleur River near its mouth. This channel is crossed by the St. Lawrence River.

Toponymy 
The toponym "Lafleur river" evokes the surname of a resident of French descent by the name of Dumont dit Lafleur, who in 1681 owned land in this area of Saint-Jean-de-l'Île-d'Orléans, in the south-east of the island. The name of the Lafleur river appears on the map of Villeneuve of 1689, under the spelling "Rivière à la Fleur".

The 1709 plan of Gideon of Catalonia rather includes the designation of "Ruiso at the Fountain" to identify this watercourse. Then, the original designation of the watercourse comes back into force with an evolving spelling according to the authors: "Rivière La Fleur" according to Le géographe Joseph Bouchette (1831); "Lafleur River" according to the 1914 Dictionary of Rivers and Lakes of the Province of Quebec; "Rivière à la Fleur" according to the Geographic Directory of Quebec in 1969 and finally "Rivière Lafleur" in 1978 according to the Toponymic Directory of Quebec published by the Commission de toponymie.

The current spelling of the toponym is formalized on March 28, 1974 at the Place Names Bank of the Commission de toponymie du Québec.

Notes and references

See also 

 L'Île-d'Orléans Regional County Municipality
 Île d'Orléans, an island
 Saint-Jean-de-l'Île-d'Orléans, a municipality
 St. Lawrence River
 Chenal des Grands Voiliers
 List of rivers of Quebec
 List of islands of Canada#Quebec

Rivers of Capitale-Nationale